Outwoods may refer to the following places in England:
Outwoods, East Staffordshire, Staffordshire
Outwoods, Leicestershire
Outwoods, Stafford, Staffordshire
Outwoods, Warwickshire

See also
Outwood (disambiguation)